Lock and Dam No. 2 is located along the Upper Mississippi River near Hastings, Minnesota and construction commenced in 1927. A hydroelectric station that produces about 4.4 megawatts is owned by the city of Hastings, while the  lock is operated by the St. Paul district of the U.S. Army Corps of Engineers' Mississippi Valley Division. There's also a wide earthen dam on the western side of the facility.

Following construction, the original lock walls settled and began to lean out of alignment, so a replacement lock was built.  It was finished in 1948.  A rehabilitation phase ran from 1987 to 1995. In 2009, Lock and Dam No. 2 became home to the nation's first commercial, federally licensed hydrokinetic power facility, which is a partnership between the City of Hastings and Hydro Green Energy, LLC of Westmont, IL.

See also
Mississippi National River and Recreation Area

References

External links
U.S. Army Corps of Engineers, St. Paul District: Lock and Dam No. 2
U.S. Army Corps of Engineers, St. Paul District: Lock and Dam 2 brochure
Google Maps: Lock and Dam No. 2
USGS, Locks 1 through 13

Buildings and structures in Hastings, Minnesota
Dams in Minnesota
Driftless Area
Mississippi National River and Recreation Area
Mississippi River locks
Transportation buildings and structures in Washington County, Minnesota
United States Army Corps of Engineers dams
Gravity dams
Dams on the Mississippi River
Mississippi Valley Division
Locks of Minnesota